Vikram Chatwal (born November 1, 1971) is an American hotelier and actor.

Early life and education 
Chatwal was born in Addis Ababa, Ethiopia and his family moved to Montreal, Quebec, Canada in the 1970s and then to New York City in the 1980s, where his father invested in fine dining and hotels. Chatwal is of Indian Sikh heritage, growing up in a Sikh household and attended Sikh camp in upstate New York where he learned to recite prayers. Chatwal attended the United Nations International School in New York City as well as the Wharton School of Business where he graduated in 1993.

Career 
Chatwal's father, Sant Chatwal, founded Hampshire Hotels and Resorts, as well as the Bombay Palace restaurant chain, but in 2014 had to resign as CEO due to an arrest by the FBI on illegal campaign contributions to which Sant Chatwal pleaded guilty in the US District Court, Eastern District of New York getting US$500,000 fine and 1,000 hours community service.

After graduating from Wharton in 1993, Chatwal decided to try a career path different from the family business and began working for Morgan Stanley. He worked as an actor and movie producer, landing roles in films such as Zoolander and Honeymoon Travels Pvt. Ltd. He was also a model, becoming the first Sikh model to appear in Vogue Magazine. Chatwal decided to join the family business in 1999 and opened the Time Hotel, a luxury hotel located in New York City. This was the first of six independent luxury hotels that he initially operated under his company Vikram Chatwal Hotels.

In 2006 Chatwal opened the Night Hotel, located in New York's Times Square. In his early career, Chatwal was often referred to as a "Playboy" for his eccentric lifestyle and social network he hung out with. During that time, he was named one of the world's most eligible bachelors by a BBC television program the magazine Radar. Chatwal's business was affected by the real-estate crisis of the 1990s and in August 2010, it was reported Chatwal's flagship property the Dream Hotel in Manhattan was scheduled to enter foreclosure proceedings within 90 days if he did not make payment on a $99 million mortgage. Despite the economy, Chatwal expanded his hotel-management operations by opening additional hotels in New York City, Miami and overseas. The initial expansion came in 2010 with the opening of the Chatwal Hotel, a $100 million project in the former Lambs Club building in the Theater District of Manhattan. Through his expansions, Vikram has helped grow the Chatwal brand to include additional properties in Manhattan, Miami, Bangkok and Cochin, India.

In 2015, Chatwal's Dream New York hotel completed a $20 million renovation. Updates included a playscape in the ground floor lobby as well as updates to guest rooms and suites. As part of the renovation, the hotel name was changed from Dream New York to Dream Midtown.

During his career, Chatwal was awarded the Entrepreneur of the Year Award at the first South Asia Media Awards in New York City in June 2005. He was also featured on the June 19, 2006 cover of Forbes Asia. He is also attributed as revitalizing the hotel industry in Manhattan, opening the Time Hotel during a time when few other hotel groups were investing in the area.

Filmography 
 Sold (2014)
 Spring Breakers (2012), Executive Producer
 Days of Grace (2011)
 Honeymoon Travels Pvt. Ltd. (2007)
 Karma, Confessions and Holi (2006)
 Hope and a Little Sugar (2006)
 Ek Ajnabee (2005)
 One Dollar Curry (2004)
 Zoolander (2001)

Personal life 
Chatwal was married to Indian model Priya Sachdev on 18 February 2006. The wedding was spread across ten days in three Indian cities. It was attended by more than 600 people from 26 countries and included notable guests such as steel magnate Lakshmi Mittal, model Naomi Campbell, Patricia Velásquez, rapper P Diddy, Prince Nikolaos of Greece, Bill Clinton, and several Indian celebrities. Chatwal and Sachdev were legally separated 2011.

Chatwal was engaged to Spanish model Esther Cañadas in 2013. They broke up approximately one month later, after which it was initially reported that Chatwal filed a lawsuit against Cañadas to recover the $300,000 engagement ring that he gave her but the matter was settled out of court.

In April 2013, Chatwal was arrested at Fort Lauderdale–Hollywood International Airport in Florida while trying to board an aircraft with cocaine, marijuana and prescription pills. After posting $13,000 bail, he flew back to New York City to attend a drug treatment program, which helped in dropping the charges by the 17th Circuit Court in Broward County the following year.

In 2016, he was arrested again, this time by the New York City police for setting fire to 2 dogs with an aerosol can and lighter.
Chatwal was booked for torturing animals, reckless endangerment and criminal mischief. He pleaded guilty and was sentenced to five days of community service. As part of a plea deal he was also ordered to undergo mental health treatment and random drug testing and must live with his parents.

References 

1971 births
American people of Indian descent
American Sikhs
American hoteliers
Living people
American people of Punjabi descent
Wharton School of the University of Pennsylvania alumni
People from Addis Ababa
United Nations International School alumni